Kelley Mote (April 27, 1923 – October 21, 2015) was a professional American football player who played wide receiver for six seasons for the Detroit Lions and New York Giants. He died on October 21, 2015, in North Carolina at the age of 92.

In his first two seasons with the Detroit Lions, Mote caught a total of 29 catches for 392 yards and one touchdown. After an unimpressive season in 1949 with four catches and 58 yards, Mote signed with the New York Giants, where he spent the last three years of his career. Across his six seasons in the NFL, Mote caught 52 passes for 754 yards and six touchdowns.

References

1923 births
2015 deaths
American football wide receivers
Detroit Lions players
New York Giants players
Duke Blue Devils football players
South Carolina Gamecocks football players
Players of American football from Georgia (U.S. state)
Sportspeople from Fulton County, Georgia
People from Hapeville, Georgia